The Emperor's Candlesticks is a 1937 historical drama film starring William Powell and Luise Rainer and directed by George Fitzmaurice. It is based on the 1899 novel of the same name by Baroness Orczy. The story follows the adventures of spies from opposing sides who fall in love while following the eponymous candlesticks—and the papers hidden inside them—all over turn-of-the-20th-century Europe.

Plot
While visiting Vienna incognito, Russian Grand Duke Peter (Robert Young) is lured away from a masquerade ball by the beautiful Maria (Maureen O'Sullivan), only to find himself the prisoner of Polish nationalists. Peter is made to write a letter to his father, the Tsar of Russia, offering to exchange him for Maria's father, who has been sentenced to be executed.

Because their previous petitions for clemency were intercepted and never reached the Tsar, the Poles task secret agent Baron Stephan Wolensky (William Powell) to deliver the letter. Meanwhile, Colonel Pavloff (Frank Reicher), head of the Russian secret police, assigns his own agent, Countess Olga Mironova (Luise Rainer), to take to Russia documents incriminating Wolensky as an enemy agent, along with an order for his arrest.

Since he is already going to Saint Petersburg, Wolensky's friend, Prince Johann (Henry Stephenson), asks him to deliver a pair of ornate candlesticks to a princess. Each of the candlesticks has a secret compartment, so the baron secretly places the letter in one. Later, when Prince Johann amuses Countess Mironova by showing her the candlesticks' unusual feature, she puts her documents inside the other, and persuades the prince to entrust the pair to her. When Wolensky is given the news, he sets off in pursuit.

A complication arises when Mironova's maid, Mitzi Reisenbach (Bernadene Hayes), and Mitzi's lover Anton (Donald Kirke) steal her jewelry and the candlesticks. As they trace the candlesticks, first to Paris and then to London, Wolensky and Mironova admit to each other that they are on opposite sides, but this does not prevent them from falling in love.

Finally, the candlesticks are put up for auction. The countess places the winning bid, but since only cash is acceptable as payment, she does not have enough to pay for them. The baron solves the problem by offering to pool their resources, each getting one candlestick. Wolensky chooses what he believes is the one with his letter, but he picks the wrong one. He finds and reads his own death warrant. When Mironova tries to exchange candlesticks, Wolensky declines. She then offers to deliver both sets of documents, while Wolensky remains safely outside Russia. He does not trust her, but knowing the price of her failure, offers to give her back her papers once he has safely delivered Peter's letter.

Meanwhile, the Polish patriots become restless at the long, unexplained delay. Korum (Douglas Dumbrille) favors killing Peter, but Maria persuades the others to wait until they hear from Wolensky. Peter eavesdrops and is pleased. The Tsar pardons and releases Maria's father in exchange for his son.

In St. Petersburg, Pavloff arrests Miranova at her mansion. When Wolensky shows up there with her documents, she tosses them into the fireplace. Pavloff takes them both before the Tsar. The ruler of Russia graciously frees the loving couple, who decide to marry.

Cast

 William Powell as Baron Stephan Wolensky
 Luise Rainer as Countess Olga Mironova

 Robert Young as Grand Duke Peter
 Maureen O'Sullivan as Maria
 Frank Morgan as Colonel Baron Suroff
 Henry Stephenson as Prince Johann

 Bernadene Hayes as Mitzi
 Donald Kirke as Anton
 Douglas Dumbrille as Korum
 Charles Waldron as Dr. Malchor

 Ian Wolfe as Leon
 Barnett Parker as Albert
 Frank Reicher as Pavloff
 Bert Roach as Porter
 Paul Porcasi as Santuzzi
 E. E. Clive as Auctioneer
 Emma Dunn as Housekeeper
 Frank Conroy as Colonel Radoff
 Philo McCullough as Conspirator (uncredited) 
 Larry Steers as Conspirator (uncredited)

Reception
According to MGM records the film earned $733,000 in the US and Canada and $600,000 elsewhere resulting in a profit of $259,000.

Bosley Crowther (bylined B.R.C) praised the film in his July 9, 1937, review for The New York Times: “The Baroness Orczy, one of light literature’s most deserving noblewomen, has seldom if ever enjoyed handsomer screen treatment… …the producers have breathed debonair life into a shopworn tale of intrigue and espionage, opening the action brilliantly and suddenly as a popping champagne cork at a masked ball in Vienna and taking it on an itinerary of world capitals which includes… a perfectly enchanting St. Petersburg, on which the snow falls in great, soft, downy, Tchekovian flakes – and what if they are corn flakes? A delightful Summer-weight picture, full of romantic encounters in Continental train sheds, the piping of Mittel-Europa locomotives, the amazing old-fashioned simplicity of pre-war European politics, with nothing more complicated than secret documents, hidden compartments in silver candlesticks, black-net dominoes and string orchestras…a picture to take one’s mind off the world and the weather. William Powell is magnificently Polish and baronial… The other people are just as right. Robert Young, as the susceptible son of the czar (who was apparently being difficult in those days about Poland) is a triumph of grand-ducal make-up and bearing; Maureen O’Sullivan, with the tree bark combed out of her hair, is charming and spunky as the Polish beauty… Frank Morgan… is agreeably Frank Morganish; Henry Stevenson…is splendid as what the Soviets would assuredly call a decadent aristocrat. And the list goes on … (T)he story is the old one about the two secret agents who fall in love while engaged on intersecting missions, and depends for its effects on plot manipulations as studied and formal as a ballet, but in this case it is narrated deftly and plausibly with a wealth of purely cinematic embellishments. An inventory of its assets must include rich and tasteful production, directorial finesse, skillful editorial joinery of scene to scene, and casualness and grace of acting—all of which combine to make of “The Emperor’s Candlesticks” one of the pleasantest surprises of the summer.”

Production 
According to TCM's Jeremy Arnold,  “The studio lavished huge amounts of money and effort on the film, a true 'A' production with a formidable cast and sumptuous sets and costumes …. Today, it's that glossy star power, given the full MGM treatment, which makes The Emperor's Candlesticks fun to watch.”

Credit for the qualities that won high praise from Bosley Crowther at the time (see above) belongs to: Producer John W. Considine Jr.; Director Geo. Fitzmaurice, assisted by Edward Woehler; Cinematographers Harold Rosson and Oliver T. Marsh (uncredited); Film Editor Conrad A. Nervig; Art Director Cedric Gibbons, assisted by Daniel B. Cathcart and Edwin B. Willis; Costumes by Adrian; Music by Franz Waxman. Writers Harold Goldman, Monckton Hoffe and Herman J. Manckiewiz worked from the novel by Baroness Orczy with additional dialogue provided by Hugh Mills, John Meehan and Erich von Stroheim

This was the third—and last—film co-starring Luise Rainer and William Powell. The first was a romantic comedy called Escapade (1935).  Rainier won the Academy Award for Best Actress for her performance as Anna Held opposite Powell as Florenz Ziegfeld in their second film, The Great Ziegfeld (1936).

References

External links

 
 
 
 

1937 films
American black-and-white films
Films scored by Franz Waxman
Films based on British novels
Films directed by George Fitzmaurice
Metro-Goldwyn-Mayer films
1937 romantic drama films
American spy films
Films set in Vienna
Films set in Paris
Films set in London
Films set in Poland
Films set in Russia
American romantic drama films
Films based on works by Emma Orczy
1930s historical romance films
American historical romance films
1930s English-language films
1930s American films